Blocksworld was a physics-based 3D sandbox video game developed by Linden Lab originally for the iPad on July 6, 2013. It was later released for the iPhone on 2016, and later, via Steam on September 25, 2017. As of 2020, Blocksworld is absent from Linden Lab's website (excluding previous press releases), and servers were fully shut down on June 17, 2020. It was subsequently removed from the App Store afterwards, and was later pulled from Steam on July 2, 2020.

Gameplay
In Blocksworld, players could build from 3D building blocks that could be combined to construct simple or complex creations. Players could also use "action blocks" and a drag-and-drop visual programming tool to add interactivity and gaming to their creations. Examples included drivable cars, flyable jets, and playable games with win/lose conditions, health systems, and other attributes. Players could also upload their creations for others to play.

Development

Blocksworld was initially developed by Swedish independent video game developer Boldai (originally named Creative Builder) which was acquired by US-based Linden Lab in early 2013. An earlier paid version of the game was briefly available in 2012 in Sweden, Iceland, Finland, Denmark and Norway for 28 Swedish Krona. Blocksworld was intended to be released worldwide on 13 December 2012 for US$0.99. This was later pushed back until Linden Lab's acquisition. For the subsequent global release, the game was repositioned as a freemium offering where players have the option to purchase premium sets and games, additional building objects and pieces, coins, and other upgrades and extras for a small fee.

References

2013 video games
Educational games
Emergent gameplay
Free online games
Indie video games
IOS games
MacOS games
Video games developed in Sweden
Windows games